James Wayne Wood (August 9, 1924 – January 1, 1990), (Col, USAF), was an American aeronautical engineer, U.S. Air Force officer, test pilot, and astronaut in the X-20 Dyna-Soar program.

Early life and education
Wood was born on August 9, 1924, in Paragould, Arkansas. He considered Pueblo, Colorado his home town. Wood earned a Bachelor of Science degree in Aeronautical Engineering from the U.S. Air Force Institute of Technology in 1954. He was married and had three children.

Test pilot

Wood served in the U.S. Army Air Corps during World War II, and flew 10 combat missions. In the Korean War, he flew more than 100 combat missions.

As a USAF Test Pilot School graduate, he was serving as an experimental test pilot at the Air Force Flight Test Center, Edwards AFB, California when selected for the X-20 Dyna-Soar program in April 1960. However, before his selection, he had been an unsuccessful applicant for NASA Astronaut Group 1. Wood was the senior test pilot on the Dyna-Soar project and was slated to be the pilot on its first sub-orbital mission. If the program had not been cancelled, the first drop test would have been in July 1964. After the Dyna-Soar program was cancelled on December 10, 1963, he remained with the U.S. Air Force and served as Commander of Test Operations at Edwards Air Force Base until 1978. He retired from the U.S. Air Force with the rank of colonel. Wood later was test pilot and Director of Operations, Tracor Flight Systems Inc., in Newport Beach, California.

Wood served as the 1975 president of the Society of Experimental Test Pilots and was a Fellow of the organization.

Death
Wood died in Melbourne, Florida, on January 1, 1990, of natural causes, aged 65.

References

External links

Astronautix biography of James W. Wood
Spacefacts biography of James W. Wood

1924 births
1990 deaths
Air Force Institute of Technology alumni
American aerospace engineers
American astronauts
American test pilots
Aviators from Arkansas
Aviators from Colorado
United States Air Force personnel of the Korean War
American Korean War pilots
People from Paragould, Arkansas
People from Pueblo, Colorado
20th-century American engineers
United States Army Air Forces officers
United States Army Air Forces pilots of World War II
United States Air Force officers
U.S. Air Force Test Pilot School alumni
Military personnel from Colorado